The Gas and Water Works Facilities Act 1870 (33 & 34 Vict. Chapter LXX) is an Act of the Parliament of the United Kingdom which regulated the construction of gas and water works.

Background       
The gas and water industries had been regulated by local Acts of Parliament and by Public General Acts such as the Gasworks Clauses Act 1847. The Gas and Water works Act aimed to facilitate the acquisition of powers by local authorities for the construction of gasworks and waterworks.

Gas and Water Works Facilities Act 1870 
The Gas and Water Works Facilities Act 1870 received Royal Assent on 9 August 1870. Its long title is ‘An Act to facilitate in certain cases the obtaining of powers for the construction of Gas and Water Works and for the supply of Gas and Water.’

Provisions 
The Act comprises 15 Sections and 2 Schedules.

Preliminary.

 Section 1: Short title.      
 Section 2: Interpretation of terms.          

Description of Cases within this Act.        

 Section 3: Act to apply to certain cases. 

Provisional Orders authorizing Gas and Water Undertakings.      

 Section 4: By whom provisional orders authorizing undertakings may be obtained.            
 Section 5: Notices and deposit of documents by promoters as in schedule.            
 Section 6: Board of Trade to consider application and objection. 
 Section 7: Board of Trade to make Provisional Order. Form and contents of Provisional Order. Costs of Order.       
 Section 8: Publication of Provisional Order.          
 Section 9: Confirmation of Provisional Order by Act of Parliament.             
 Section 10: Incorporation of general Acts in Provisional Order.     
 Section 11: Cesser of powers at expiration of prescribed time.     
 Section 12: Gas rents and water rates.    
 Section 13: Company not exempt from provisions of general Act.               
 Section 14: Queen in Council may substitute any department for Board of Trade for the purposes of this Act.         
 Section 15: Act not to apply to Metropolis.          

SCHEDULE A. Districts, Local Authorities, Boroughs, Townships, and the authorities within these locations.             

SCHEDULE B. Provisional Orders.              

 Part I. Advertisement in October or November of intended application.   
 Part II. Deposit on or before 30 November.      
 Part III. Deposit on or before 23 December.     
 Part IV. Deposit and advertisement of Provisional Order when made.

Amendments 
The Act was amended by the Gas and Water Works Facilities Act 1870 Amendment Act 1873. The Act was repealed by the Gas Act 1948.

See also 

 Oil and gas industry in the United Kingdom

References 

United Kingdom Acts of Parliament 1870